A.cian (Hangul: 에이션; pronounced Asian) is a South Korean boy band formed by  Wings Entertainment (formerly ISS Entertainment) in Seoul, South Korea. The group currently consists of four members: Jungsang, Hyeokjin, Sanghyun and Jino. They debuted on September 28, 2012 with the single "Stuck".

Members

Current
 Jungsang (Hangul: 정상)
 Hyeokjin (혁진)
 Sanghyun  (상현)
 Jin.O (진오)

Former
 U-Tae (우태)
 Seulgi (슬기)
 Chanhee (찬희)
 Crooge (크루지)
 Hidden (히든)
 Lo-J (로제이)
 Sehee (세희)

Discography

Extended plays

Single albums

Singles

References

External links
 

K-pop music groups
South Korean boy bands
South Korean dance music groups
Musical groups from Seoul
Musical groups established in 2012
2012 establishments in South Korea
South Korean pop music groups